Uptown is a live album by American jazz pianist Billy Taylor featuring tracks recorded in 1960 and released on the Riverside label.

Reception

Allmusic awarded the album 3 stars stating "Although Taylor's activities as a highly articulate spokesman for jazz have sometimes overshadowed his playing, he shows throughout this fine CD reissue that he has long ranked among the best".

Track listing
All compositions by Billy Taylor except as indicated
 "La Petite Mambo" (Erroll Garner) - 5:45    
 "Jordu" (Duke Jordan) - 4:10    
 "Just the Thought of You" - 4:59    
 "Soul Sisters" - 5:36    
 "Moanin'" (Bobby Timmons) - 5:13    
 "Warm Blue Stream" (Sara Cassey, Dotty Wayne) - 4:55    
 "Biddy's Beat" - 4:14    
 "Cu-Blu" - 4:01    
 "'S Wonderful" (George Gershwin, Ira Gershwin) - 3:51

Personnel 
Billy Taylor - piano
Henry Grimes - bass
Ray Mosca - drums

References 

1960 live albums
Billy Taylor live albums
Riverside Records live albums
Albums produced by Orrin Keepnews